Petr Domin (born January 2, 1983) is a Czech former professional ice hockey forward.

Domin made his Czech Extraliga debut during the 1999–00 season with HC Karlovy Vary and played 32 regular season games for the team over the next five seasons, scoring two goals and three assists.

Domin played in the 2003 World Junior Ice Hockey Championships for the Czech Republic.

References

External links

1983 births
Living people
Czech ice hockey forwards
Diables Noirs de Tours players
HC Dukla Jihlava players
HC Karlovy Vary players
BK Mladá Boleslav players
HC Olomouc players
Piráti Chomutov players
Sportovní Klub Kadaň players
Stadion Hradec Králové players
Czech expatriate sportspeople in France
Expatriate ice hockey players in France
Czech expatriate ice hockey people